"Jopping" is the debut single by South Korean pop group SuperM. It was released on October 4, 2019 as the first single from the eponymous debut extended play by SM Entertainment and Capitol Records.

Composition and lyrics
"Jopping", a combination of words jumping and popping, is the lead track off SuperM’s self-titled debut EP.
The song features heavy electro-pop influences with references to brit-pop sounds. The song uses cinematic-style horns and a groovy beat. A fusion of pop-rock, R&B, and hip-hop genres can be heard in the vocal and rap talents of each member.

Music video
Filmed in the UAE desert and Dubai’s urban jungle, the futuristic video features supercars and bikes in action, while a helicopter sits pretty in the background. The Meydan Bridge, Business Bay and Sheikh Zayed Road’s famous skyline are also spotted on ‘Jopping’ video at one point, while Al Khail Road and the deserted landscape of Ras Al Khor also features in the 4.44 long video.

Live performances
The group performed "Jopping" for the first time on a showcase at the Capitol Records building in Los Angeles on October 5, 2019. On October 9, 2019 the group made their American TV debut on The Ellen DeGeneres Show performing the song. On February 11, 2020 the group performed the song on Jimmy Kimmel Live!.

Charts

Accolades

Release history

Credits and personnel 
Credits adapted from album's liner notes.

Studio 
 SM Booming System – recording, mixing, engineered for mix, digital editing
 Sonic Korea – mastering

Personnel 

 SM Entertainment – executive producer
 Lee Soo-man – producer
 Lee Sung-soo – production director
 Tak Young-jun – management director
 Kim Young-min – executive supervisor
 SuperM – vocals, background vocals 
 Tay Jasper – producer, lyrics, composition, background vocals
 Adrian Mckinnon – producer, lyrics, composition, background vocals
 Kim Min-ji – lyrics
 Hwang Yu-bin – lyrics
 Geoffrey McCray – composition
 Zachary Chicoine – composition
 Nasia Jones – composition
 Marcus Scott – composition
 LDN Noise – producer, composition, arrangement
 Yoo Young-jin – arrangement, vocal directing, background vocals, recording, mixing, engineered for mix, digital editing, music and sound supervisor
 Jeon Hoon – mastering

References 

2019 debut singles
2019 songs
SuperM songs
Korean-language songs
SM Entertainment singles
Capitol Records singles